Westside Neighborhood School is a private independent school in Los Angeles, California.  Founded in 1980, the school operates preschool, elementary school, and middle school grades (K-8).

WNS is notable for a program of "Family Groups," collections of students from all grades who meet several times a year during school hours to work as a team on projects such as dramatic programs, organizing school functions, and work on community service projects. These joint efforts unite the students into a community unlimited by age and grade levels. Students stay in the same Family Group as long as they attend WNS, eventually leading their groups in their graduation years.

Through the school year ending in 2005, WNS was Westchester Neighborhood School, located in south Westchester directly under the final approaches of aircraft landing at Los Angeles International Airport (LAX), hence the "Jets" nickname used by the school's athletic teams.  In September 2005 classes resumed in a vastly improved  facility in Playa Vista. WNS added a second building to its campus in 2010 featuring additional space for performing arts, Spanish, and choral music. The school's third campus building with provide 26,000 additional will instructional space for the preschool, a full-sized gymnasium, and middle school STEAM Academic Complex.

References

External links
 Westside Neighborhood School's Web site

Private middle schools in California
Private elementary schools in California